The Trak Starz are an American hip hop songwriting and record production duo from St. Louis, composed of Alonzo "Zo" Lee Jr. and Shamar "Sham" Daugherty.

Biography
Credited with helping establish St. Louis in the hip-hop community, the Trak Starz quickly developed a reputation as one of the rap industry's marquee production teams. Prior to forming The Trak Starz in 2000, Sham and Zo had known each other for over 7 years. Zo played in numerous reggae and funk bands including Reggae At Will and Dr. Zhivegas, while Sham was in a group called Out of Order. Zo also utilized his keyboard skills to produce tracks for various regional rappers. After producing a few tracks for Sham's Out of Order group the two began producing together, forming The Trak Starz. Soon after, the newly formed partners produced an album for Da Hol’ 9, a group that was signed to MCA Records. They also received production credits on albums for Bone Thugs-n-Harmony, Krayzie Bone and Tyrese, as well as producing background music for various MTV shows. After their work with Da Hol’ 9 and other artists, The Trak Starz were managed by Chaka Zulu, whose connections helped them sign former 3 Strikes group member Chingy to Disturbing tha Peace Records. After signing with The Trak Starz production company, the three began working on Chingy's solo album. According to Zo:

The first song created in that small apartment was "Right Thurr", the overnight nationwide hit that would launch the relative unknowns to stardom, as well as Chingy's solo career. Their melodic, irresistible, radio-friendly beats spawned numerous hits from Chingy's debut album Jackpot,  which would go on to sell over 3 million copies. The overwhelming success of Chingy also propelled The Trak Starz to the forefront of hip-hop production, landing them their own label deal. Zo explains:

After securing a deal with Barry Hankerson's (R. Kelly, Toni Braxton, JoJo, Ginuwine and Aaliyah) Blackground Records, The Trak Starz hoped to develop local artists from their Trak Starz Productions roster including rapper Louie V, female R&B group STL, rap duo 2 Deep, male R&B singer JuJu, and male solo rapper 47. Zo explains:

The Trakstarz number 1 hit song Right Thurr has featured in many movies including the Netflix hit movie Don’t Look Up featuring Leonardo Dicaprio and Jennifer Lawrence. The Trakstarz also landed production in hit movies such as Shark Tale, Coach Carter, I, Robot, Identify Theft and many others. In 2004, Right Thurr was used as the lead song for Ea sports NBA Live.

2003-2004
By the end of 2003, The Track Starz had earned production credits on Ludacris' multi-platinum Chicken-n-Beer (“Splash Waterfalls”) and Britney Spears' "Me Against the Music (The Trak Starz Remix)." Their success would continue in 2004 lending their talents on Houston's hit single "I Like That," which they wrote, produced and parlayed into a multimillion-dollar advertising campaign. They also earned a Diamond certification and a Grammy Award nomination for Album of the Year with their contributions on Usher's Confessions. However, they would lose to Ray Charles' Genius Loves Company. Additional production credits would also include Chingy's Platinum certified Powerballin' and DreamWorks Shark Tale soundtrack.

Star Studded and side-projects
In 2005 The Trak Starz, now managed by Larry Rudolph (Britney Spears' manager) of ReignDeer Entertainment, announced the release of their debut album titled Star Studded. The album's guest list was extensive, initially including David Banner, Twista, Juvenile, Lil Jon, Timbaland, Chingy, Nate Dogg, Bun B. and Jon B. Recorded in their state-of-the art studio in St. Louis, The Trak Meet, the first official single titled "Take it Off," featured STL and T Deep, the first artists signed to the Trak Starz label.
According to Sham:

According to The Trak Starz, one of the most highly anticipated tracks is what the duo referred to as the “Producers’ Anthem,” featuring producers who, like The Trak Starz, are also artists. The concept was simple, each of the album's producer's will rhyme a verse over their own beat, with The Trak Starz molding the different styles into one seamless track.
In regards to the album Zo has stated,"
 
The album was due to be released in November 2005, however it was never released.

In addition to their own album, The Trak Starz were continuously working on numerous projects for artist such as Nas, Ludacris, E-40, Chingy and Janet Jackson, while co-writing with Babyface for Aretha Franklin's Jewels in the Crown: All-Star Duets with the Queen. The song was slated for Aretha Franklin and Beyoncé however it was not featured on the album. They were also producing the score for an urban dance movie, called Behind The Groove. In regards to the movie Zo is quoted as saying,

Release Therapy - present
2007 proved to be another big year for The Trak Starz earning a Grammy Award for their production on Ludacris' 2006 Release Therapy album. Their award for Best Rap Album was achieved for their production on "Do Your Time" featuring Beanie Sigel, C-Murder and the late Pimp C.

After earning their first Grammy Award, The Trak Starz continued to focus on their label and promoting new artists on their Trak Starz Productions roster, including male rapper, Lil Tek and female R&B singer, Darra Dee.

They also formed a joint venture with Grind Up/Asylum/Warner Bros. Records to release St. Louis’, Ludy.

In addition, The Trak Starz and their up-and-coming in-house production team, The Bakery (formerly including DJsNeverEndingStory), produced the hit "Pop, Lock, and Drop It” for Jive Records/HiTz Committee recording artist Huey.

They are also producing Trak Starz Records recording artist and St. Louis native Tydis' new album, Sensation.

Currently, they have sold over 20 million records worldwide.

Partial discography

Production credits

Remixes

References

External links
 The Official Trak Starz Website

American hip hop record producers
American rhythm and blues keyboardists
Midwest hip hop musicians
Musical groups from St. Louis
Record production duos